Jean-Julien Rojer and Horia Tecău defeated Rohan Bopanna and Florin Mergea in the final, 6–4, 6–3 to win the doubles tennis title at the 2015 ATP World Tour Finals.

Bob and Mike Bryan were the defending champions, but lost in the semifinals to Rojer and Tecău.

Seeds

Alternates

Draw

Finals

Group Ashe/Smith
Standings are determined by: 1. number of wins; 2. number of matches; 3. in two-players-ties, head-to-head records; 4. in three-players-ties, percentage of sets won, or of games won; 5. steering-committee decision.

Group Fleming/McEnroe
Standings are determined by: 1. number of wins; 2. number of matches; 3. in two-players-ties, head-to-head records; 4. in three-players-ties, percentage of sets won, or of games won; 5. steering-committee decision.

References

External Links
Main Draw

Doubles